The following is a list of Cleveland Tigers (NFL) players. The Cleveland Tigers were the first Cleveland, Ohio team franchise in what became the National Football League. The Tigers played in the "Ohio League" before joining the American Professional Football Association during the 1920 and 1921 seasons.



B
Bert Baston,
Harry Baujan,
George Brickley,
Jim Bryant

C
Stan Cofall,
Tuffy Conn,
Earl Cramer,

D
Mark Devlin, big Sean,
Dinger Doane,
Moon Ducote

G
Johnny Gilroy,
Tom Gormley

H
Doc Haggerty,
Sandy Hastings,
Pat Herron

K
George Kerr

M
Phil Marshall,
Joe Mattern

O
Ed O'Hearn,
Jack O'Hearn

P
Red Pearlman,
Leo Petree,
Al Pierotti

R
Frank Rydzewski

S
Herb Sies,
Butch Spagna,
Jake Stahl

T
Tiny Thornhill,
Ray Trowbridge,

W
Al Wesbecher

References
Pro Football Reference Cleveland Tigers Roster

 
Cleveland Tigers
Tigers (NFL) players